Hines Peak is a mountain of the Topatopa Mountains, in Ventura County, California, at an elevation of . It is the second highest peak of the Topatopa Mountains after Cobblestone Mountain.

It is located within the Ventura County section of Los Padres National Forest, several miles northeast of Santa Paula.
Snow falls on the mountain during the winter months.

See also
 Topatopa Mountains
 Los Padres National Forest
 Transverse Ranges
Cobblestone Mountain

References

Topatopa Mountains
Mountains of Ventura County, California
Los Padres National Forest
Mountains of Southern California